This is a list of home automation topics on Wikipedia. Home automation is the residential extension of building automation. It is automation of the home, housework or household activity.  Home automation may include centralized control of lighting, HVAC (heating, ventilation and air conditioning), appliances, security locks of gates and doors and other systems, to provide improved convenience, comfort, energy efficiency and security.

Home automation topics

0-9
 6LoWPAN

A
  Alarm.com, Inc.
  AlertMe
  AllJoyn
 Arduino

B
Belkin Wemo
 Bluetooth LE (BLE)
 Brillo (Project Brillo)
  Bticino
  Bus SCS
 Building automation

C
 Connected Device
  C-Bus (protocol)
  CHAIN (industry standard)
  Clipsal C-Bus
  Comparison of domestic robots
  Control4

D

  Daintree Networks
  Dishwasher
  Domestic robot
  Dynalite

E
 ESP32
 ESP8266
  Ember (company)
  European Home Systems Protocol
  Extron Electronics

G
  Generalized Automation Language
  GreenPeak Technologies

H
 Home Assistant (home automation software)
 Home automation
  Home automation for the elderly and disabled
  HomeLink Wireless Control System
  HomeOS
  HomeRF
  Honeywell, Inc.

I
 Indoor positioning system
 Internet of Things
  Insteon
  Intelligent Home Control
  IoBridge
  iSmartAlarm
 IEEE 802.15.4

L

  Lagotek
 Lawn mower
  Lighting control system
  LinuxMCE
  LonWorks
 List of home automation topics
 List of home automation software
 List of network buses

M
 Marata Vision
 Matter (standard)
 MCU (Micro Controller Unit)
 MiWi
 Mobile device
 Mobile Internet device

N

  Nest Labs
 NodeMCU

O
  OpenHAN
  Openpicus
  OpenTherm

R

 Responsive architecture
 Robotic lawn mower
 Rotimatic

S
  SM4All
  Smart device
  Smart environment
  Smart grid
  Smartlabs
  Smart lock
  Stardraw

T
  Timer
 Thread (network protocol)

U
  Universal Home API
  Universal powerline bus

V
  Vacuum cleaner

W

 Web of Things
  Washing machine
  Window blind

X
  X10 (industry standard)
  X10 Firecracker
  XAP Home Automation protocol
  XPL Protocol

Z
 Z-Wave
 Zigbee

See also
 Home automation
 List of home automation topics
 List of home automation software
 List of home appliances
 Building automation
 Connected Devices
 Robotics

References

 

Home automation
Building engineering